Johann Reinhold Forster (22 October 1729 – 9 December 1798) was a German Reformed (Calvinist) pastor and naturalist of partially Scottish descent who made contributions to the early ornithology of Europe and North America. He is best known as the naturalist on James Cook's second Pacific voyage, where he was accompanied by his son Georg Forster. These expeditions promoted the career of Johann Reinhold Forster and the findings became the bedrock of colonial professionalism and helped set the stage for the future development of anthropology and ethnology. They also laid the framework for general concern about the impact that alteration of the physical environment for European economic expansion would have on exotic societies.

Biography

Forster's family originated in the Lords Forrester in Scotland from where his great-grandfather had emigrated after losing most of his property during the rule of Oliver Cromwell along with many other Scots. Forster himself was born in the city of Dirschau (Tczew) in the Crown of Poland. He studied languages and natural history at the Joachimsthal Gymnasium in Berlin, theology at the University of Halle, afterwards serving as a Protestant pastor in Mokry Dwór (Nassenhuben) Pomeranian Voivodship. He married his cousin Elisabeth Nikolai. They had several children including a son, Georg Forster and a daughter   Virginia Viktoria.

In 1765 he accepted an offer made to him by the Russian government to inspect and report upon the new colonies founded on the banks of the Volga, in the province of Saratov. His irritable temper soon involved him in difficulties with the Russian government, and in the following year he went with Georg (the eldest of eight children, seven of which survived childhood) to England and became teacher of natural history at Warrington, Lancashire.

He spent three years teaching at the Dissenting Warrington Academy, succeeding Joseph Priestley. Compelled by his violent temper to resign this appointment, Forster then moved with his son to London, where they earned a precarious living by doing translations. In 1771, he published A Catalogue of the Animals of North America, which listed the region's mammals, birds, reptiles, fish, insects, arachnids, and crustaceans, and led to his election to the Royal Society of London in 1772.

When Joseph Banks withdrew at the last moment as naturalist on Cook's second voyage, Forster and his son were appointed to fill the vacant position. In July 1772 they set sail on the Resolution, returning to England in July 1775. During a stop in Cape Town, Forster engaged Anders Sparrman to act as his assistant.

Both the Forsters kept detailed diaries of everything they saw on the voyage, and made extensive collections of both natural history specimens and artefacts. The first publication after the voyage was Characteres generum plantarum, a book on the botany of the South Pacific. Based on his father's journals, Georg published A Voyage Round the World in 1777. Reinhold Forster published Observations Made during a Voyage round the World (1778). However the income from the book was insufficient to clear his debts, and the bulk of Georg's drawings from the voyage had to be sold to Joseph Banks. During the next few years Forster undertook a variety of writing work, including a German translation of Thomas Pennant's Arctic Zoology.

Johann Reinhold’s "Observations Made During a Voyage Round the World" (1778) and Georg’s "A Voyage Round the World" (1777). "Employing the English word “race” as a synonym for human variety, they interpret the multiplicity of Polynesian culture in terms of a linear hierarchy that naturally ascends towards the white European ideal."

In November 1779 Forster was appointed Professor of Natural history and Mineralogy at the University of Halle, and director of the Botanische Garten der Martin-Luther-Universität Halle-Wittenberg, where he remained until his death. His Descriptiones animalium, completed within a month of returning to England with Cook, was eventually edited by Hinrich Lichtenstein and published in 1844.

Forster's contributions to the Philosophical Transactions of the Royal Society (1772–73) on zoology, ornithology, and ichthyology established him as one of the earliest authorities on North American zoology.

Forster was elected a member of the American Philosophical Society in 1793.

See also
 European and American voyages of scientific exploration

Taxon described by him
See :Category:Taxa named by Johann Reinhold Forster

Taxon named in his honor 
The black-side hawkfish (Paracirrhites forsteri), freckled hawkfish or Forster's hawkfish, is a species of marine ray-finned fish, a hawkfish belonging to the family Cirrhitidae. It is from the Indo-Pacific.

The forster's tern ('Sterna Forsteri') is a species of tern, primarily from the Americas.

References

External links
Scans of Specimen Historiae Naturalis Volgensis at the Göttinger Digitalisierungszentrum
Biography at the Australian Dictionary of Biography
SUB Göttingen Forster, J. R. 1771.Novæ species insectorum. Centuria I. Londini. (Davies, White).
 Gaedike, R.; Groll, E. K. & Taeger, A. 2012: Bibliography of the entomological literature from the beginning until 1863 : online database – version 1.0 – Senckenberg Deutsches Entomologisches Institut. 
Indische Zoologie 1781
The Resolution journal of Johann Reinhold Forster, 1772-1775. Royal Geographical Society of South Australia

1729 births
1798 deaths
People from Tczew
Botanists with author abbreviations
Botanists active in the Pacific
Bryologists
Fellows of the Royal Society
18th-century German botanists
German entomologists
People from Royal Prussia
18th-century Polish–Lithuanian Commonwealth people
German ornithologists
James Cook
German people of Scottish descent